Fairy Tail Zero (stylized as FAIRY TAIL ZERØ) is a Japanese manga series written and illustrated by Hiro Mashima. It is a prequel to Mashima's Fairy Tail manga, depicting the events leading to the formation of the titular wizards' guild. The manga was serialized in Monthly Fairy Tail Magazine from July 2014 to July 2015, with the 13 chapters collected into a single graphic novel by Kodansha. The collected volume was released in North America by Kodansha USA. The eighth season of the Fairy Tail anime television series included an adaptation of Fairy Tail Zero, which aired January to March 2016.

Plot

In X679, six-year-old Mavis Vermillion lives on Sirius Island as a servant at the Red Lizard wizards' guild following the deaths of her parents. A violent skirmish breaks out between Red Lizard and the rival Blue Skull guild, leaving Mavis the apparent sole survivor alongside Zera, the daughter of Red Lizard's master, who becomes her friend. Seven years later, a trio of treasure hunters – Yuri Dreyar, the future father of Makarov Dreyar; Precht Gaebolg, the future leader of the dark guild Grimoire Heart; and future Wizard Saint Warrod Sequen – comes to the island in search of its sacred relic, the Sirius Orb. As Yuri contends with a teenage Mavis over ownership of the orb, they discover it has already been taken by Blue Skull. Mavis forms a truce with the treasure hunters to recover the orb, proposing that Zera accompany them as well.

The group journeys to the city of Magnolia, where Blue Skull has established a brutal regime. Mavis attempts to bluff the guild into returning the orb by using her illusory magic, but fails to deceive the guild's master, Geoffrey. Outmatched, the group retreats into a nearby forest where Mavis encounters Zeref, an infamous dark wizard. Unaware of his identity, Mavis expresses sympathy for Zeref upon realizing he is afflicted with a curse that kills all life around him against his will. Grateful for her company, Zeref agrees to teach the treasure hunters how to use magic so they can combat Blue Skull, becoming friends with Mavis in the process.

After Mavis and her friends successfully overthrow Blue Skull and capture Geoffrey, she discovers that the orb has become contaminated with evil magic. Yuri ignores her warnings and takes the orb for himself, becoming possessed by its magic and unwillingly fusing with Blue Skull's massive skeletal dragon, which rampages mindlessly through the city. Mavis exorcises the magic from Yuri by casting Law, a prototype spell learned from Zeref, which permanently halts Mavis's physical age as a side effect.

Guilt-ridden over Mavis's sacrifice, Yuri dedicates his life to protecting her. After Mavis accepts his friendship, he confesses to her that no one can see or hear Zera besides her, revealing Zera to be a sentient illusion that Mavis subconsciously created in place of the real Zera, who died during Blue Skull's raid on the island. With Zera's encouragement, Mavis accepts her as an illusion, causing her to disappear. To protect and reassure the people of Magnolia, Mavis and the treasure hunters organize Fairy Tail in Zera's memory.

Production
In an interview included in the Fairy Tail Zero graphic novel, Hiro Mashima said he first rejected the idea of him creating a manga for Monthly Fairy Tail Magazine because he was so busy with the weekly Fairy Tail and supervising its anime adaptation. But after taking on a one-off "dream job" designing characters for a video game, he realized that he should be focusing on manga and agreed to create one for the magazine. Everyone involved agreed early on that it would be a Fairy Tail spin-off starring Mavis, but Mashima wondered what "era" it would take place in. Although he figured most fans wanted to know how she became a ghost, the author felt that story should be included in the main series. When he originally created Mavis for the main series, Mashima conceived an old, grandfatherly character, only to learn that "Mavis" was a feminine name. He thought that having the first guild master be a female would be a surprise, but found that everyone around him knew it was a feminine name and expected Mavis to be female as a result. Still wanting to surprise readers, Mashima then made her a young girl. Her unexpected popularity resulted in Mavis making further appearances in the main series and in Mashima thinking more and more about her past, leading to Fairy Tail Zero focusing on how the guild was founded. He said that its founding was supposed to be more important to the main series' storyline, but because Zero is a spin-off, he had to walk a fine line where it would "inform" the main story without being required reading. Mashima and his editor argued about whether or not readers would realize that "Law" and "Fairy Law" are different, with the latter being based on the former and refined by Mavis to have no side effect.

The chapters for the manga were 20 pages each and spanned a year across all 13 issues of Monthly Fairy Tail Magazine. Mashima called such a page limit too short for a monthly series, and said it resulted in him having to cut things from the story; such as Mavis overcoming a hatred of guilds, and Zera being the reason Geoffrey easily escapes from his cage. He designed Zera specifically for the series as a bully who becomes a kind person later in life, likening her to the character Éponine in Les Misérables. Mashima designed thick, black eyebrows for her to contrast with Mavis's short, thin ones. He also tried to keep Zera's identity a secret, although his staff had already figured it out after reading the first chapter, and were surprised when she reappeared in the second; however, he was able to fool Mavis's voice actor, Mamiko Noto. Mashima expressed disappointment how, when naming Yuri Dreyar, nobody involved realized that the name Yuri had previously been used for a character in volume 43 of Fairy Tail. Acknowledging that there are many characters in the series, he said that he always tries to avoid the possibility of characters being confused with one another when naming them; describing it as one of the "rules" of storytelling. The author briefly considered having the two Yuris be the same character, but said he had to give that up as they look completely different. When asked about how Geoffrey is revealed to be the founder of the Phantom Lord guild, Mashima said in hindsight it was a mistake to have never mentioned Jose's last name in the main series as the two characters are related.

Media

Manga
Hiro Mashima began writing and illustrating the series in the first issue of Kodansha's Monthly Fairy Tail Magazine on July 17, 2014. The series ended in the magazine's 13th and final issue on July 17, 2015. The author stated that although the series was intended to be exclusive to the magazine, they received a lot of requests for a graphic novel version. The single collected volume was released on November 17, 2015.

The series is licensed in North America by Kodansha USA, who announced their license at an event at Books Kinokuniya in New York on November 15, 2015. They published the collected volume on July 12, 2016.

Anime

An adaptation of Fairy Tail Zero was announced for the Fairy Tail anime television series on the jacket bands of Fairy Tail volume 52 and on the single collected volume of the series. The adaptation premiered on January 9, 2016. Funimation simulcasted the series as part of the anime's eighth season with a broadcast dub in North America.

Reception
The tankōbon of Fairy Tail Zero ranked 11th in sales by the end of its first week of release, selling approximately 7,104,878 copies. The volume ranked 21st on its second week, and 40th on the third week. The New York Times listed the North American release as the 10th best selling manga at the end of its first week, and 8th on the second week.

Notes

References
Fairy Tail Zero manga volume by Hiro Mashima. Original Japanese version published by Kodansha. English translation published by Kodansha USA.

Other sources

External links

  
 

Fairy Tail
2015 comics endings
Adventure anime and manga
Anime series based on manga
Fantasy anime and manga
Funimation
Kodansha manga
Prequel comics
Shōnen manga